Selepa plumbeata is a moth of the family Nolidae first described by George Hampson in 1912. It is found in Oriental tropics of India, Sri Lanka, and Borneo.

Description
Its forewings are grayish. Submarginal closer to margin. There is a grayish triangle on the central costa.

Its larval food plants are members of the genus Anacardium.

References

External links
Seasonal occurrence of insect-pests on aonla (Emblica officinalis Geartn) and their natural enemies

Moths of Asia
Moths described in 1912
Nolidae